This is a list of the National Register of Historic Places listings in Cascade County, Montana. It is intended to be a complete list of the properties and districts on the National Register of Historic Places in Cascade County, Montana, United States. The locations of National Register properties and districts for which the latitude and longitude coordinates are included below, may be seen in a map.

There are 47 properties and districts listed on the National Register in the county, including 3 National Historic Landmarks.

Listings county-wide

|}

Former listings

|}

See also

 List of National Historic Landmarks in Montana
 National Register of Historic Places listings in Montana

References

Cascade